Narrow-leaved paperbark is a common name used to describe several species of flowering plants in the genus Melaleuca:

 Melaleuca alternifolia, endemic to Australia
 Melaleuca linariifolia, endemic to Eastern Australia